Rim-Sîn I (Dri-im-Dsuen) ruled the ancient Near East city-state of Larsa from 1758 BC to 1699 BC (in short chronology) or 1822 BC to 1763 BC (middle chronology). His sister En-ane-du was high priestess of the moon god in Ur. Rim-Sin I was a contemporary of Hammurabi of Babylon and Irdanene of Uruk.

Reign

Rim-Sin’s reign of Larsa started sometime around 1822 BC (in middle chronology) when he succeeded his brother, Warad-Sin. He immediately began to expand Larsa by attacking the neighboring city-states of Uruk, Isin, and Babylon. By 1808 BC, the city was so big that other cities were worried about its growth. The king of Isin, the ruler of Uruk, and the chief of Babylon campaigned against Rim-Sin. He defeated them, then occupied Pi-Naratim (the mouths of the Tigris and Euphrates) in 1807, Zibnatum in 1805, Bit-Susin and Uzarbara in 1804, and Kisarra in 1802. He also destroyed Der in that year.  In 1801 BC he sacked Uruk, sparing its inhabitants. In 1797 he invaded the territory of Isin, finally seizing the capital in 1792 BC. This conquest was so important to Rim-Sin that every year name of his rule after was named in years after the sack of Isin.

In 1787 BC, Hammurabi, the king of Babylon, attacked Isin and reports to have conquered it, but this is more likely an exaggeration of a successful raid. In 1764 BC, Hammurabi turned against Rim-Sin, who had refused to support Hammurabi in his war against Elam despite pledging his troops. Hammurabi, with troops from Mari, first attacked Mashkan-shapir on the northern edge of Rim-Sin's realm. Hammurabi's forces quickly reached Larsa, and after a six-month siege the city fell. Rim-Sin escaped the city but was soon found and taken prisoner and died thereafter.

See also

Chronology of the ancient Near East
Kings of Larsa

Notes

External links
Rim-Sin I Year Names at CDLI

Amorite kings
19th-century BC Sumerian kings
18th-century BC Sumerian kings
18th-century BC deaths
Year of birth unknown
Kings of Larsa
Monarchs taken prisoner in wartime
People who died in prison custody
18th-century BC people